The Ferrer Rocks are a group of rocks in Gerlache Strait lying between Ketley Point, Rongé Island, and Useful Island. They were charted by the Chilean Antarctic Expedition (1950–51) and named for Lieutenant Fernando Ferrer Fouga, hydrographic officer on the Angamos.

References 

Rock formations of Graham Land
Danco Coast